José Oscar Aguilar González (born 27 December 1957) is a Mexican politician from the Institutional Revolutionary Party. He has served as Deputy of the LVII and LXI Legislatures of the Mexican Congress representing Puebla.

References

1957 births
Living people
Politicians from Puebla
Deputies of the LVII Legislature of Mexico
Institutional Revolutionary Party politicians
21st-century Mexican politicians
20th-century Mexican politicians
Members of the Congress of Puebla
Meritorious Autonomous University of Puebla alumni
Academic staff of the Meritorious Autonomous University of Puebla
Deputies of the LXI Legislature of Mexico
Members of the Chamber of Deputies (Mexico) for Puebla